The 4th European Games is an upcoming international sporting event planned to take place in June 2027. A host city has not yet been selected. All Olympic sports held at the 2027 European Games will provide qualification opportunities for the 2028 Summer Olympics in Los Angeles, United States.

Host selection
In October 2022, Leading officials at the European Olympic Committees (EOC) have claimed that they are closing in on securing a host for the 2027 European Games. Spain, France and Portugal have been touted as potential bidders. As of February 2023, the only city to express any form of interest in hosting the event is Split, Croatia. The bid is spearheaded by the Split Olympians Club, who mention the ability to put all funding towards renovating currently existing venues rather than constructing new ones. It is unclear whether there is any support from the Split City Council or the Government of Croatia.

See also

 European Games
 2023 European Games
 2019 European Games
 2015 European Games
2027 European Para Championships

References

European Games